Central is a station of the Kolkata Metro located on the crossing of Bepin Behari Ganguly Street and Central Avenue in Bowbazar, Central Kolkata.

The station

Structure
Central is underground metro station, situated on the Kolkata Metro Line 1 of Kolkata Metro. The station has a central island platform and two side platforms. Between each side platform and the island platform is a track, serving up and down trains. The station was built in this layout as it was anticipated that the Kolkata Metro Line 2 will interchange with Kolkata Metro Line 1 at this station and the layout will effectively handle all the traffic. However, that did not happen and the side platforms are not used. Instead of opening doors on both sides, trains open doors on the right side, that is towards the island platform.

Station layout

Connections

Bus
Bus route number 3B, 12C/2, 13, 30C, 43, 47B, 78, 214, 214A, 222, 237, 242, S119 (Mini), S122 (Mini), S139 (Mini), S151 (Mini), S152 (Mini), S158 (Mini), S159 (Mini), S160 (Mini), S161 (Mini), S163 (Mini), S164 (Mini), S165 (Mini), S171 (Mini), S173 (Mini), S175 (Mini), S181 (Mini), S184 (Mini), C24, E25, MIDI1, S3A, S3B, S9A, S10, S11, S15G, S17A, S57, AC20, AC39, VS1 etc. serve the station.

Entry/Exit

See also

Kolkata
List of Kolkata Metro stations
Transport in Kolkata
Kolkata Metro Rail Corporation
Kolkata Suburban Railway
Kolkata Monorail
Trams in Kolkata
Bhowanipore
Chowringhee Road
List of rapid transit systems
List of metro systems

References

External links
 
 Official Website for line 1
 UrbanRail.Net – descriptions of all metro systems in the world, each with a schematic map showing all stations.

Kolkata Metro stations
Railway stations in Kolkata
Railway stations opened in 1995